Tom Huff may refer to:

 Tom E. Huff (1938–1990), American author
 Tom Huff (politician) (1933–2013), American businessman and politician